A tamalin is a type of drum.

External links 
 Information about tamalin (plus images, 3D animation and audio), Virtual Instrument Museum, Wesleyan University

Drums